The 2021 LCK season was the tenth season of South Korea's LCK, a professional esports league for the MOBA PC game League of Legends.

2021 was also the first season LCK implemented their long-term partnership model. On 1 November 2020, Riot Korea announced the ten organizations that successfully signed the contract for LCK franchising model.

The regular season format was double round robin. During the first round of the split, games were played five days per week, and for the second round, games took place four days a week.

The spring split began on 13 January 2021 and concluded with the spring finals on 10 April 2021.

Broadcasting
The LCK was broadcast at the following platforms:
 Korean: Naver, Afreeca TV, Twitch
 English: Twitch
 Chinese: HuyaTV
 French: OTP

Spring

Regular season

Playoffs

Summer

Regular season

Playoffs

References 

League of Legends
2021 multiplayer online battle arena tournaments
League of Legends Champions Korea seasons